James Donald Anderson, Jr. (August 16, 1930 – November 20, 1976) was an American herpetologist with the American Museum of Natural History and professor of zoology at Rutgers University who did extensive fieldwork studying Ambystoma and other salamander species in Mexico. He was born in Newark, New Jersey, on August 16, 1930, and grew up in the nearby town of Belleville. He attended the Rutgers University–Newark College of Arts and Sciences and earned a B.A. in zoology in 1954. From 1954 to 1960 he was a graduate student at UC Berkeley, working under Robert C. Stebbins.  Anderson returned to Rutgers University–Newark as a faculty member in 1960, and died from injuries sustained in a car accident on November 20, 1976. Anderson's salamander (Ambystoma andersoni ) is named after him.

He published 150 peer-reviewed papers.  His two most cited papers are: 
"A Comparison of the Food Habits of Ambystoma macrodactylum sigillatum, Ambystoma macrodactylum croceum, and Ambystoma tigrinum californiense". Herpetologica 24 (4) (Dec., 1968): 273–284.  (cited 55 times according to Google Scholar);
"The Life History of the Mexican Salamander Ambystoma ordinarium Taylor". (with Richard D. Worthington). Herpetologica 27 (2) (Jun., 1971): 165–176.   (cited 43 times according to Google Scholar).

References

American herpetologists
1930 births
1976 deaths
Rutgers University faculty
University of California, Berkeley alumni
Rutgers University alumni
People from Newark, New Jersey
20th-century American zoologists